Larvik Cone is a low but prominent scree cone,  high, on the promontory between Newark Bay and Jacobsen Bight, on the south coast of South Georgia. It was roughly sketched by the British South Georgia Expedition, 1954–55, and named "Larvik Peak" from association with nearby Larvik. The South Georgia Survey, 1956–57, reported that cone is a more suitable descriptive term.

References

Mountains and hills of South Georgia